Merdinli is a village in the Fuzuli District of Azerbaijan. During the period between the end of the First Nagorno-Karabakh war and the end of the 2020 Nagorno-Karabakh war the village was controlled by the unrecognized Republic of Artsakh as a part of its Hadrut Province.

References 

Populated places in Fuzuli District